LEI is one of the research institutes of Wageningen University and Research Centre (WUR). Within the Netherlands and Belgium, LEI is the leading institute for social-economic research in the fields of agriculture, horticulture and fisheries, the management of rural areas, the agricultural sector and the production and consumption of food. 
Through this research, LEI provides support for the decisions that governments and businesses need to make in the fields of competitiveness, the management of production chains, spatial planning, environmental protection, natural resources, the European Common Agricultural Policy and global trading.

LEI also performs legal and service-related tasks for the Ministry of Agriculture, Nature and Food Quality. The Agricultural Economic Report and other annual reports present an impression of the financial and economic position of companies and sectors.

History 
LEI – originally the Landbouw Economisch Instituut (Agricultural Economics Institute) – was established in the late 1930s by agricultural organisations. In the 1970s it became part of the Dutch ministry of Agriculture and in the 1990s it was privatised.
LEI now forms part of Wageningen University and Research Centre, within which it combines with the Department of Social Sciences to form the Social Sciences Group.

External links
www.lei.wur.nl/UK

Research institutes in the Netherlands
Wageningen University and Research